"Lost in Stereo" is a song by American rock band All Time Low and the third and last single taken from their third studio album, Nothing Personal (2009). It was released through Hopeless Records as a digital download on April 4, 2010.

Track list
 "Lost in Stereo" – 3.47
 "Damned If I Do Ya (Damned If I Don't) [Blueskies remix]" – 4.16
 "Lost in Stereo (music video)" – 3.47

Music video
The music video for "Lost in Stereo" shows the band playing shows from their Glamour Kills Tour in 2009, and also features clips from their "Straight to DVD" film.

Chart performance
"Lost in Stereo" debuted on April 4, 2010 in the UK Singles Chart at #156, marking All Time Low's second single to impact the chart. Throughout March and April 2010, the single also climbed the UK Indie Chart and UK Rock Chart, reaching #13 and #2 respectively on April 12, 2010. On April 18 it reached #63 on the UK singles chart.

References

2010 singles
All Time Low songs
2009 songs
Hopeless Records singles
Songs written by Alex Gaskarth